Tai Mong Tsai is a village and an area in Sai Kung District, Hong Kong.

Administration
Tai Mong Tsai is a recognized village under the New Territories Small House Policy.

See also
 Sai Kung West Country Park
 Historic churches of Sai Kung Peninsula
 Wong Mo Ying

References

External links

 Delineation of area of existing village Tai Mong Tsai (Sai Kung) for election of resident representative (2019 to 2022)

Villages in Sai Kung District, Hong Kong